"It's All Too Much"/"Never Say Die" is the fourteenth single by Japanese pop singer-songwriter Yui. The single was released on October 7, 2009. The two songs were used for the first live-action film adaptation of the manga series Kaiji, as theme song and insert song, respectively. "It's All Too Much"/"Never Say Die" debuted at number one in the first week sales with sales of 75,047 copies and is Yui's 5th overall number one single on the Japanese Oricon charts. The single is certified Gold by the Recording Industry Association of Japan (RIAJ) for shipment of 100,000 copies.

Track listing
Normal Edition

Limited Edition
Normal Edition + DVD

References

2009 singles
2009 songs
Japanese film songs
Oricon Weekly number-one singles
Songs written by Yui (singer)
Sony Music Entertainment Japan singles
Kaiji (manga)
Yui (singer) songs